John Stroppa (January 2, 1926 – May 7, 2017) was an award-winning halfback who played in the Canadian Football League for the Winnipeg Blue Bombers from 1949 to 1951.

A native of Winnipeg, Stroppa took the league by storm in 1949, being the surprise winner of the Dr. Beattie Martin Trophy for Canadian rookie of the year in the west. He also played in the famed Mud Bowl, the 1950 Grey Cup but retired after a serious mid-season kidney injury in 1951.

After his playing days Stroppa moved to Edmonton because of his job, and took up amateur officiating. He then became one of the few professional players to become a CFL referee, working 250 games in 15 years, after which he became the CFL's supervisor of officials for another 11 years. He died in Edmonton on May 7, 2017.

References

1926 births
2017 deaths
Canadian Football League Rookie of the Year Award winners
Players of Canadian football from Manitoba
Canadian football people from Winnipeg
Winnipeg Blue Bombers players